Western Bulk is a global dry bulk shipping company operating around 150 vessels in the handysize to panamax category. The headquarter is located in Oslo, and the company has offices in Singapore, Seattle, Santiago and Casablanca.

Western Bulk is owned by about 225 shareholders, with Kistefos AS controlling about 75% of the shares through two of its wholly owned subsidiaries.

History
The company was founded in 1982, and between 1993 and 2001 the company was listed on the Oslo Stock Exchange. In 2006 the company was taken fully over by the controlling company Kistefos. In June 2017, Western Bulk was registered on the N-OTC list under the ticker "WEST".

Preferences 

Dry bulk shipping companies
Shipping companies of Norway
Companies based in Oslo
Transport companies established in 1982
1982 establishments in Norway
Companies listed on the Oslo Stock Exchange